This is a list of topics on working time and conditions.

Legislation
 See :Category:Employment law

Working time
 See :Category:Working time
 Flextime

Working conditions
Biosafety level
Casual Friday
Decent work
Dress code
Gainful employment
Happiness at work
Industrial noise
Industrial and organizational psychology
Managing up and managing down
Office humor
Occupational justice
Occupational safety and health
Occupational Safety and Health Administration
Protective clothing
Temporary work
Whistleblower
Work–life balance
Workplace politics

Adverse conditions
Employment discrimination
Workplace bullying
Legal aspects of workplace bullying
Organizational retaliatory behavior
Workplace deviance
Hostile work environment
Work accident
Occupational apartheid
Occupational stress
Occupational injustice
Work–family conflict
Workplace incivility
Job lock
Unpaid work

See also
Job attitude
Work motivation

Working time and conditions
Working time and conditions
Working time and conditions
 
!